Dromasaurs are a paraphyletic group of anomodont therapsids from the Middle Permian. They were small with slender legs and long tails. Their skulls were short, but the eye sockets were large. Dromasauria was once considered to be a major group of basal anomodonts along with the infraorder Venyukovioidea. It includes the genera Galepus, Galechirus, and Galeops, all from southern Africa. Below is a cladogram based on Modesto and Rubidge (2000), Liu et al. (2009) and Cisneros et al. (2011):

See also
 Evolution of mammals
 Dicynodonts

References

Anomodonts
Paraphyletic groups